= Plant parasite =

A plant parasite can be:

- a parasitic plant, a plant whose host is another plant
- a micropredator, a small external parasite of a plant
